The municipality of Zürich is divided into twelve districts (known as Kreis in German), numbered 1 to 12, each one of which may contain anywhere between 1 and 4 neighborhoods.  There are a total of 34 neighborhoods.  Zürich is also divided into 25 postal areas, roughly corresponding to small districts and neighborhoods of larger districts.

Two large expansions of the city limits occurred in 1893 and in 1934 when the city of Zürich merged with many surrounding municipalities, that had been growing increasingly together since the 19th century.  Most of the district boundaries are fairly similar to the original boundaries of the previously existing municipalities before they were incorporated into the city of Zürich.

Each district has a district office, which serves as an official registrar and provides various administrative functions. Larger neighborhoods also have their own neighborhood office.

Politically, the significance of the districts has diminished, especially in elections where smaller districts have aligned with larger districts on some issues, forming between five and nine constituencies.  School districts are no longer aligned with districts, as well as Civil Law notaries and church parishes.

References 
Zürich District